Aleksandar Fabijanić (born 18 June 1965) is a Croatian rower. He competed in the men's coxed four event at the 1992 Summer Olympics.

References

External links
 

1965 births
Living people
Croatian male rowers
Olympic rowers of Croatia
Rowers at the 1992 Summer Olympics
Sportspeople from Rijeka